Clarence V. Peirce (December 25, 1850 – December 2, 1923) was an American farmer and politician.

Born in the community of Germania, Marquette County, Wisconsin, Peirce went to the public schools and to business college in London, Ontario, Canada. He was in the mercantile business. He was also in the milling business. Peirce was also a livestock dealer and a dairy farmer. He was involved with the Westfield State Bank in Westfield, Wisconsin and the state bank in Wilsonville, Nebraska. Peirce served on the local draft board during World War I. From 1891 to 1895, Peirce served in the Wisconsin State Assembly and was a Republican. He then served in the Wisconsin State Senate from 1895 to 1899. Peirce died from a stroke at his home, in Eau Claire, Wisconsin.

References

1850 births
1923 deaths
Politicians from Eau Claire, Wisconsin
People from Marquette County, Wisconsin
Businesspeople from Wisconsin
Farmers from Wisconsin
Republican Party Wisconsin state senators
Republican Party members of the Wisconsin State Assembly